Bull Shoals is located in Arkansas and Missouri in the southern United States. It was originally a swift-moving section of the White River in Arkansas.
Bull Shoals Dam in northern Arkansas was built between 1947 and 1951 to form the lake
Bull Shoals Lake is formed by the dam and covers portions of Arkansas and Missouri
Bull Shoals, Arkansas is the city near the dam
Bull Shoals-White River State Park is below the dam in Arkansas